Bhagwanpur Legislative Assembly constituency (SC) is one of the seventy electoral Uttarakhand Legislative Assembly constituencies of Uttarakhand state in India. It includes Bhagwanpur area of Haridwar District.

Bhagwanpur Legislative Assembly constituency (SC) is a part of Haridwar (Lok Sabha constituency).

Members of Legislative Assembly

Election results

2022

See also
 Haridwar (Lok Sabha constituency)

References

External links
  
http://eci.nic.in/eci_main/CurrentElections/CONSOLIDATED_ORDER%20_ECI%20.pdf. The Election Commission of India. p. 509.
http://ceo.uk.gov.in/files/Election2012/RESULTS_2012_Uttarakhand_State.pdf
https://web.archive.org/web/20090619064401/http://gov.ua.nic.in/ceouttranchal/ceo/ac_pc.aspx
https://web.archive.org/web/20101201021552/http://gov.ua.nic.in/ceouttranchal/ceo/ac_detl.aspx

Haridwar
Assembly constituencies of Uttarakhand
2002 establishments in Uttarakhand
Constituencies established in 2002